Jakob Sigismund Beck (originally Jacob Sigismund Beck; 6 August 1761 – 29 August 1840) was a German philosopher.

Biography
Beck was born in the village of Liessau (Lisewo) in the rural district of Marienburg (Malbork) in Royal Prussia, Poland in 1761. The son of a priest (of Liessau), he studied (after 1783) mathematics and philosophy at the University of Königsberg, where Christian Jakob Kraus, Johann Schultz, and Immanuel Kant were his teachers. After his studies he first accepted a post as a teacher at a grammar school in Halle. With his thesis Dissertatio de Theoremate Tayloriano, sive de lege generali, secundum quam functionis mutantur, notatis a quibus pendent variabilibus, which he wrote in Halle, he was qualified as a university lecturer. He then worked as a lecturer of philosophy at the University of Halle (1791–1799), before he became a professor of philosophy at the University of Rostock. He devoted himself to criticism and explanation of the doctrine of Kant, and in 1793 published the Erläuternder Auszug aus den kritischen Schriften des Herrn Prof. Kant, auf Anrathen desselben (Riga, 1793–1796), which has been widely used as a compendium of Kantian doctrine.

Beck endeavoured to explain away certain of the contradictions which are found in Kant's system by saying that much of the language is used in a popular sense for the sake of intelligibility, e.g. where Kant attributes to things-in-themselves an existence under the conditions of time, space and causality, and yet holds that they furnish the material of our apprehensions. Beck maintains that the real meaning of Kant's theory is idealism; that knowledge of objects outside the domain of consciousness is impossible, and hence that nothing positive remains when we have removed the subjective element. Matter is deduced by the original synthesis. Similarly, the idea of God is a symbolic representation of the voice of conscience guiding from within. The value of Beck's exegesis has been to a great extent overlooked owing to the greater attention given to the work of J. G. Fichte. Beside the three volumes of the Erläuternder Auszug, he published the Grundriss der kritischen Philosophie (1796), containing an interpretation of the Kantian Kritik in the manner of Salomon Maimon.

Beck died in Rostock.

Works 
 Erläuternder Auszug aus den Kritischen Schriften des Herrn Prof. Kant (1793–96), vol. 3: Einzig-möglicher Standpunct, aus welchem die critische Philosophie beurtheilt werden muß (1796)

Notes

1761 births
1840 deaths
18th-century German philosophers
18th-century philosophers
19th-century German non-fiction writers
19th-century German male writers
19th-century German writers
19th-century German philosophers
19th-century philosophers
Academic staff of the University of Rostock
Continental philosophers
Epistemologists
German idealism
German male non-fiction writers
Idealists
Kantian philosophers
Kantianism
Lecturers
Metaphilosophers
Writers from Gdańsk
People from Royal Prussia
Phenomenologists
Philosophers of education
Philosophers of language
Philosophers of mind
Academic staff of the University of Halle
University of Königsberg alumni